Samantha Calvert (born 14 December 1996) is an Australian professional squash player. She achieved her highest career PSA singles ranking of 111 in January 2016.

References

External links 

 Profile at PSA
 

1996 births
Living people
Australian female squash players
Sportspeople from Brisbane
21st-century Australian women